Margaret "Peggy" Schoolcraft (born March 8, 1960) is a professional female bodybuilder from Ft. Myers, Florida.

Amateur competition
1990- Ms. Delaware County- 1st overall.
1990- Ms. Southeastern Pennsylvania Regional- 1st overall
1990- Lehigh Valley National Qualifier- 1st Lightweight
1991- Junior Nationals- 2nd Lightweight, best poser award
1992- Junior USA- 1st Lightweight
1994- NPC Nationals- 4th Lightweight
1995- NPC Nationals- 3rd Middleweight
1997- Team Universe- Overall and Lightweight
1997- IFBB World Amateur Championships- World champion

Professional competition
1999- Jan Tana Classic- 5th overall
2001- Ms. International- Top 19th overall

References

American female bodybuilders
1960 births
Living people
Professional bodybuilders
21st-century American women